Windows XP 64-bit can refer to:
 Windows XP Professional x64 Edition, an operating system for x86-64 processors
 Windows XP 64-bit Edition, an operating system for IA-64 processors